Many IBM PC compatible games released between 1981 and about 1990 were self-booting and did not use MS-DOS,  IBM PC DOS, or compatible disk operating systems. The phrase "IBM PC compatible self-booting disk" is sometimes shortened to "PC booter". Self-booting disks were common for other computers as well.

These games were distributed on " or, later, ", floppy disks that booted directly, meaning once they were inserted in the drive and the computer was turned on, a minimal, custom operating system on the diskette took over. This was used as a form of copy protection until it became obsolete as games grew larger. Due to bit rot, original working versions of these floppy disks are rare, and many have largely been abandoned by their publishers. Some have been ported to other operating systems.

See also 

 Lists of video games
 Index of DOS games

Booter games
Booter games